Herborg Oline Finnset (born 28 March 1961 in Sørreisa, Troms) is a Norwegian prelate of the Church of Norway who is the Bishop of Nidaros as of 2018.

Biography
Finnset was pastor of Strinda parish in the Diocese of Nidaros, and later became Dean of Tromsø from 2005 till 2017. In 2014, she was also nominated as a candidate for the bishopric of Diocese of Nord-Hålogaland however she lost the majority of votes from the Church Council by seven to eight, and Olav Øygard was elected bishop. 

Finnset graduated from the Faculty of Law in Oslo, and was ordained priest in Oslo Cathedral in 1988. Prior to her arrival in Strinda, she had worked in Hålogaland as priest in charge of the church in Hammerfest, and later in Lenvik. 
Finnset is one of the forces behind Tromsø Church Music Festival.

She was unanimously elected bishop of Nidaros by the Church Council in 2017, and was consecrated and installed as bishop on 10 September 2017 by the Primate of the Church of Norway Bishop-Preses Helga Haugland Byfuglien in Nidaros Cathedral.

References

Bishops of Nidaros
21st-century Lutheran bishops
Norwegian Lutherans
1961 births
Living people
Women Lutheran bishops
People from Sørreisa